The following is a list of the exports of Marshall Islands. Data is for 2019, in millions of United States dollars, as reported by International Trade Centre. Currently the top fifteen exports are listed.

See also 

 Economy of Marshall Islands

References 

 International Trade Centre - International Trade Statistics (2019) - Monthly, quarterly and yearly trade data. Import & export values, volumes, growth rates, market shares, etc.

Marshall Islands
Exports